Karbo is a surname. Notable people with the surname include:

Abeifaa Karbo, Ghanaian politician
Anthony Karbo (born 1979), Ghanaian politician 
Karen Karbo (born 1956), American author and journalist
Wally Karbo (1915–1993), American professional wrestling promoter